Centres for Seafarers was an ecumenical collaboration between The Apostleship of the Sea, The Sailors Society and The Mission to Seafarers. It was a registered UK charity formed in 2006.  It was dissolved on 2 April 2019

It provided visiting seafarers a place to rest and relax and allow them time away from their ships whilst docked. Games, books, food and drink and also chaplains and a place to worship were available to visiting seafarers in two ports throughout the UK.

Locations

The charity had port chaplains and centres at various ports around the UK.

See also
Sailors Society (Protestant)
Apostleship of the Sea, (Roman Catholic)
Mission to Seafarers (Anglican)

External links
Official website

Catholic Church in England and Wales
Christian missions to seafarers